Carlo Berlingeri (1643–1719) was a Roman Catholic prelate who served as Archbishop of Santa Severina (1679–1719).

Biography
Carlo Berlingeri was born in Cotrone, Italy in 1643 and ordained a priest on 9 December 1668.
On 27 November 1679, he was appointed during the papacy of Pope Innocent XI as Archbishop of Santa Severina.
On 30 November 1679, he was consecrated bishop by Alessandro Crescenzi, Bishop of Recanati e Loreto, with Prospero Bottini, Titular Archbishop of Myra, and Pier Antonio Capobianco, Bishop Emeritus of Lacedonia, serving as co-consecrators.
He served as Archbishop of Santa Severina until his death on 5 January 1719.

References

External links and additional sources
 (for Chronology of Bishops) 
 (for Chronology of Bishops)  

17th-century Italian Roman Catholic archbishops
18th-century Italian Roman Catholic archbishops
Bishops appointed by Pope Innocent XI
1643 births
1719 deaths
People from Crotone